My Depression (The Up and Down and Up of It) is a 2014 animated short film based on My Depression: A Picture Book by Elizabeth Swados. The film was written and directed by Swados, Robert Marianetti and David Wachtenheim, and featured the voices of Sigourney Weaver, Steve Buscemi and Fred Armisen. Distributed by HBO, My Depression was premiered at the 2014 Tribeca Film Festival and competed in Best Documentary (Short Film).

Cast 
 Sigourney Weaver
 Steve Buscemi as "Suicidal Thoughts"
 Fred Armisen
 Dan Fogler
 Rachel Stern – vocal

Critical response 
The New York Times described the film "as charming and whimsical a discussion of depression as you’re likely to find... it's honest and forthright as it talks about a condition often misunderstood and misrepresented." BroadwayWorld commented, "Simultaneously heartfelt and entertaining, My Depression illuminates the symptoms, emotions and side effects of the disorder through witty animation, comedy and unique musical numbers."

References

External links 
 
 

2014 films
Films about depression
2010s English-language films